Ustad Farida Mahwash; (1947) is an Afghan singer and voice of Afghanistan. She was the first  woman (as of 2013) to have been conferred the honorary title of  "Ustad" (meaning Master or Maestra in Dari) in 1977.  She currently lives in Fremont, California, US; and tours the world with her latest all star ensemble Voices of Afghanistan.

Biography

Style
Ustad Farida Mahwash is the "voice of Afghanistan," and one of the most beloved singers in the entire Central Asian region. Her robust, luminous voice with its subtle command of ornamentation has dazzled audiences worldwide, as she shares her country's rich musical heritage through performances and recordings.

Early life
Farida Gulali Ayubi was born into a conservative Afghan family. Her mother was a Quran teacher, who recited with a beautiful voice, an early inspiration to the young girl. But religion loomed large in the family, and for many years, her interest in music was suppressed. Upon completing her studies, Farida was recruited to sing for Kabul Radio. The station's director, Ustad Khayal, encouraged her to pursue singing as a career. It was Ustad Khayal who gave Farida her enduring stage name, Mahwash, which means "like the moon."Mahwash's robust and mellifluous voice, and her command of the subtle art of ornamentation, has gone on to dazzle audiences worldwide, as she shares her country's rich musical heritage through performances and recordings.

Early music career
Mahwash then took music and singing lessons under the tutelage of Ustad Mohammad Hashim Chishti. An established maestro, Chishti quickly launched his protégé on a rigorous training regime. Most of his lessons, which are based on North Indian classical music, are still used today to train Afghan singers. Mahwash went on to study with the renowned Afghan singer Ustad Hussain Khan Sarahang, who guided her through hermeteoric rise as a radio star. Another master composer, Ustad Shahwali, created many songs for her to sing on the radio. One of the best known was "O Bacha (Oh Boy)," which brings together half a dozen regional songs in one extended modern song cycle. When Mahwash learned this complex piece and recorded it in a single day, she was given the title of Ustad—or "master" in 1977—a controversial move as, until that point, this was an honour reserved only for men.  After the political turmoil of late 1970s and '80s, Ustad Mahwash was forced to leave Afghanistan.

Moving
In 1991, she and her family moved to Pakistan, where she took refuge from two warring factions, each of whom wanted her to sing for their cause, or face assassination. Worn and exhausted, she applied for asylum abroad, and, eventually, her plight was recognised by the United Nations High Commissioner for Refugees (UNHCR). Mahwash was granted political asylum in the United States in October 1991.

In 2001, Mahwash reunited with other exiled musicians to form and lead the ensemble Kabul . This group performed at some of the most prestigious concert halls in Europe and revealed to sophisticated audiences a hitherto unknown world of uniquely beautiful music. In 2003, Mahwash and the Kabul Ensemble recorded the critically acclaimed album Radio Kaboul (Accords Croisés). This rich collection pays homage to the disappeared or exiled composers and musicians of Afghan radio's golden era. Later that year, Mahwash received a prestigious BBC Radio 3 World Music Award both for her artistic excellence and for her work in speaking on behalf of thousands of orphaned Afghan children. In 2007, Mahwash followed up with a recording secular and sacred love poems, Ghazals Afghans (Accords Croises /HarmoniaMundi), in which, Martina Catella notes, "The legendary queen of ornamentation displays a rainbow of the most refined tones and colors to express feelings of love.”

Mahwash has built her career in the face of two wars and under a forced state of isolation from her homeland. Although she had to leave Afghanistan, she has never lost her deep love for the country and its people.

Voices of Afghanistan
In 2012 Mahwash became a member of the group Voices of Afghanistan, an Afghani ensemble featuring Mahwash on vocals, rubab master Homayoun Sakhi, and The Sakhi Ensemble. Also were other notable Afghan master/ and Uzbekistan (Abbos Kosimov) musicians and singers. This collaboration debuted in June 2012 under the direction of music producer and composer Dawn Elder, who created this group with Mawash and Homayoun.

One of their landmark performances came before 27,000 American fans at the Carrier Dome for the One World Concert event. In 2012, Mahwash, Homayoun Sakhi and the group began recording a new album with world music producer Dawn Elder and Sam Nappi at World Harmony Studios.  After a year in the making they are now preparing the release.  In this recording Ustad Mahwash, Homayoun Sakhi and the group are joined by a host of notable celebrity musicians and singers including Grammy winning singer Angelique Kidjo. The album is set to release on World Harmony Studios/D E Music Records  is entitled "Love Songs for Humanity".  The official release is on 3 September 2013 on line and in stores on 27 September 2013.

Discography

Contributing artist
 The Rough Guide to the Music of Afghanistan (2010, World Music Network)
"Love Songs for Humanity (2013, D E Music)

Awards
 Janis Joplin Award.
 Golden Voice Award.
 World Music Award in 2003, by BBC, Winner in the Asia Category, within the Kaboul Ensemble

References

1947 births
Living people
People from Kabul
World music singers
Women ghazal singers
Afghan women singers
Afghan ghazal singers
Persian-language singers
20th-century Afghan women singers
21st-century Afghan women singers
Afghan expatriates in the United States